Chris Taylor (born March 6, 1972) is a Canadian former professional ice hockey player who is currently an assistant coach with the New Jersey Devils of the National Hockey League (NHL). He played in 149 NHL games with the New York Islanders, Boston Bruins, and Buffalo Sabres. In 2017, Taylor was named the head coach of the Rochester Americans in the American Hockey League, the affiliate of the Buffalo Sabres. In 2019, he was recalled by the Sabres as an assistant coach on an interim basis and returned to the Americans in late November, staying until June 2020.

Playing career 
Taylor had an impressive junior career with the London Knights, ending his tenure with the team as their all-time points leader with 378 (later surpassed by Corey Perry with 380 points) and was drafted by the New York Islanders in the 1990 NHL Entry Draft (2nd round, 27th overall) He then played for the Islanders, Boston Bruins, and Buffalo Sabres in the National Hockey League, but was frequently sent between the NHL and the minor leagues before going overseas with the Frankfurt Lions of Germany's Deutsche Eishockey Liga before the 2006–07 season.

On July 16, 2009, Taylor agreed to a two-year contract with the Rochester Americans of the American Hockey League, a team he had played for from 1999 to 2006 while he was signed to their NHL affiliate, the Buffalo Sabres.

Coaching career 
On August 31, 2011, the Rochester Americans announced that Taylor had been hired as their development coach for the 2011–12 season.  Later that season, he was promoted to an assistant coach. On June 6, 2016, incoming Rochester head coach, Dan Lambert, opted not to retain Taylor on the Americans' staff. Taylor subsequently joined the Wilkes-Barre/Scranton Penguins, AHL affiliate of the Pittsburgh Penguins, as an assistant coach on August 2, 2016.

On June 30, 2017, Taylor was named head coach of the Rochester Americans. A few days before the start of the 2019–20 season, Taylor was called up by the Buffalo Sabres as an interim assistant coach when Don Granato was forced to take a medical leave of absence from the Sabres.

On June 16, 2020, Taylor was relieved of his duties as coach, along with Amerks general manager, Randy Sexton, and assistant coaches Gord Dineen and Toby Petersen Taylor led the Amerks to a 116-65-33 record across three seasons as head coach.

On October 23, 2020, he was hired as an assistant coach by the New Jersey Devils.

Career statistics

Regular season and playoffs

Coaching record

Awards and honours

References

External links
 

1972 births
Living people
Boston Bruins players
Buffalo Sabres players
Canadian expatriate ice hockey players in Germany
Canadian expatriate ice hockey players in the United States
Canadian ice hockey centres
Canadian ice hockey coaches
Capital District Islanders players
Denver Grizzlies players
Frankfurt Lions players
Las Vegas Thunder players
London Knights players
New Jersey Devils coaches
New York Islanders draft picks
New York Islanders players
Providence Bruins players
Rochester Americans players
Rochester Americans coaches
Salt Lake Golden Eagles (IHL) players
Sportspeople from Stratford, Ontario
Utah Grizzlies (IHL) players